This is a list of ministers of Economy and the Treasury of Spain.

(1) Minister of Economic Affairs(2) Minister of the Economy(3) Minister of the Economy and Commerce(4) Minister of the Economy and the Treasury(5) Minister of the Treasury(6) Minister of the National Economy(7) Secretary of State and of the Universal Bureau of the Treasury (8) Secretary of the Universal Bureau of the Treasury (9) Secretary of Justice, Political Government and the Treasury (10) Minister of the Treasury and Civil Service

References

Economy and finance ministers of Spain
Lists of political office-holders in Spain